Electron wake is the disturbance left after a high-energy charged particle passes through condensed matter or plasma. Ions passing through can introduce periodic oscillations in the crystal lattice or plasma wave with the characteristic frequency of the crystal or plasma frequency. Interactions of the field created by these oscillations with the charged particle field alternate from constructive interference to destructive interference, producing alternating waves of electric field and displacement. The frequency of the wake field is determined by the nature of the penetrated matter, and the period of the wake field is directly proportional to the speed of the incoming charged particle. The amplitude of the first wake wave is the most important, as it produces a braking force on the charged particle, eventually slowing it down. Wake fields also can capture and guide lightweight ions or positrons in the direction perpendicular to the wake. The larger the speed of the original charged particle, the larger the angle between the initial particle's velocity and the captured ion's velocity.

References 

Encyclopedia article on the electron wake
On the possibility of accelerating positron on an electron wake at SABER

See also 
Coulomb explosion
Charged particle beam
Wake fields
Plasma acceleration
Bremsstrahlung
List of plasma (physics) articles

Atomic physics
Plasma physics
Scattering
Accelerator physics